Kevon Declan Neaves (born October 24, 1985) was a Trinidadian soccer midfielder who last played for Club Sando in the National Super League.

Career

Early career
Born in Mount Hope, Neaves was raised in Petit Valley, Trinidad and Tobago. He went on to play for St. Anthony's College, where he helped the team win three Intercollegiate Championships and was named the 2005 Trinidad High School Player of the Year. He then relocated to the United States playing in the USL Premier Development League for the Ajax Orlando Prospects. He made 12 appearances while scoring once for the farm team of Dutch club Ajax Amsterdam before playing Division I College soccer for the South Florida Bulls until 2008.

Köping FF
In 2008 Neaves relocated to Sweden, signing with Division 2 team Köping FF. He played two season with the club before returning to Trinidad and Tobago.

T&TEC
In 2010, Neaves joined the T&TEC Sports Club playing in the National Super League, the 2nd tier of professional football in Trinidad. After his debut season, Neaves was named as one of the top “Five Players of the Year” as the “Electricity Boys”, as T&TEC FC were called, finished at the top of the standings, qualifying for the TT Pro League in the process, the top flight of football in Trinidad and Tobago.

The following season saw T&TEC finish in second place to W Connection, finishing as runners-up in both the First Citizens Cup as well as the Toyota Classic before relegating back to the National Super League two seasons later.

Westside Superstarz
In 2013, he signed with Westside Superstarz F.C. playing in the National Super League once more.

Club Sando
In 2014, he signed with Club Sando remaining in the same league.

International career
Having progressed through the youth ranks of the Soca Wariors, Neaves made his debut for the Trinidad and Tobago first team under manager Leo Beenhakker in a 2–0 victory against Iceland on 28 February 2006. He made his second appearance on 29 February 2012 against Antigua and Barbuda in a 4–0 away win.

Career statistics

International
Statistics accurate as of match played 29 February 2012.

Honours

Club
T&TEC
 National Super League: 
 Winner (1): 2010
 First Citizens Cup
 Runner-up (1): 2011
 Toyota Classic
 Runner-up (1): 2011

Individual
 National Super League Topscorer: 2010

External links
 Player Profile - Kevon Neaves at Soca Warriors Online

References

1985 births
Living people
Association football midfielders
Trinidad and Tobago footballers
Trinidad and Tobago international footballers
Expatriate soccer players in the United States
Expatriate footballers in Sweden
Trinidad and Tobago expatriate sportspeople in the United States
Trinidad and Tobago expatriate sportspeople in Sweden
South Florida Bulls men's soccer players
Ajax Orlando Prospects players
MD FF Köping players
USL League Two players
TT Pro League players
TT Super League players